Interstate 380 (I-380) is a  auxiliary Interstate Highway in eastern Iowa. The route extends from I-80 near Coralville to Waterloo. I-380 connects the cities of Cedar Rapids and Waterloo, the state's second- and sixth-largest cities, respectively, to the Interstate Highway System.

Construction of I-380 took 12 years to complete, ending in 1985. After the Interstate opened, US 218 was moved onto the new freeway south of Cedar Rapids. In the 1990s, the I-380 corridor was selected as part of the Avenue of the Saints corridor, which Iowa designated as Iowa 27 in 2001. I-380 has been affected by two major floods, the Great Flood of 1993 and the Iowa flood of 2008, both of which closed the road at the Iowa River for two weeks.

Route description 
I-380 begins where US 218 and Iowa 27 cross I-80 in Coralville in Johnson County. Originally designed as a cloverleaf interchange, the Iowa Department of Transportation (Iowa DOT) began reconstructing the original interchange into a turbine interchange design in 2019. , the eastbound ramps from I-80 are utilizing the new flyover bridges while transit from northbound US 218 to westbound I-80 requires a detour via the next interchange at Forevergreen Road. The Iowa DOT projects frequent night closures of portions of the interchange to continue until completion of the upgrade, likely 2025.

From the interchange, I-380, US 218, and Iowa 27, the route assigned to the Avenue of the Saints highway in Iowa run concurrently toward Cedar Rapids. The Interstate heads north and serves North Liberty. North of North Liberty, the freeway runs parallel to the former routing of US 218 and Iowa 965; here, the two highways cross the Iowa River.  After crossing into Linn County, the three routes enter the Cedar Rapids city limits near Eastern Iowa Airport.  north of the airport, I-380 intersects US 30 and US 151 at a combination interchange. At this interchange, US 218 splits away from I-380 and Iowa 27.

Through Cedar Rapids, the I-380 freeway is elevated relative to the nearby streets and residential neighborhoods. As it approaches downtown and the Cedar River, the freeway takes a tight, 90-degree turn to the east, crosses the river and squeezes between a Quaker Oats Company plant and Alliant Energy PowerHouse, before turning back 90 degrees to the north. Between downtown and the Coldstream–29th Street interchange, I-380 serves as a dividing line between residential areas to the east and industry to the west. Toward the northern end of Cedar Rapids, industry is replaced with commerce as I-380/Iowa 27 meet Iowa 100, locally known as Collins Road, at a volleyball interchange.

The freeway leaves Cedar Rapids and enters Hiawatha, where there are two interchanges, one at Blairs Ferry Road, which shares a southbound collector ramp with Collins Road, but has its own exit and entrance ramps. There is also a diamond interchange with Boyson Road, before continuing northbound. Quickly escaping the Cedar Rapids area, I-380 turns to the northwest and passes through predominantly rural areas with small communities and farms dotting the way. Because of its northwestern angle, I-380 enters four counties within , as counties in Iowa are generally rectangular in shape. It passes Center Point in northwestern Linn County, Urbana in northeastern Benton County, where it meets Iowa 150, and Brandon in southwestern Buchanan County. The Interstate travels into Black Hawk County, heading northwest for  before turning north for  until a directional T interchange with US 20.

Together with US 20, I-380 and Iowa 27 travel west toward Waterloo and Cedar Falls. The three routes pass the eastern Waterloo suburbs of Raymond, Evansdale, and Elk Run Heights. Almost immediately after crossing the Cedar River again, I-380 splits away from US 20 and Iowa 27 and rejoins US 218 at a three-level stack interchange. I-380 and US 218 head north to the east of the Crossroads Center shopping mall. US 218 continues to the north at this point.

History 

The first section of I-380 opened to traffic on September 19, 1973. That section connected Eastern Iowa Airport to I-80 at Coralville. Within three years, the Interstate had been extended into Cedar Rapids at the Cedar River. The bridge which crossed the river would not open until June 1979. By the end of 1981, I-380 was a continuous road to the Coldstream Avenue/Glass Road interchange. The Interstate was originally scheduled to be open by December 25, 1984, but weather delays pushed back the construction timetable. The last section of I-380 to be completed opened on September 12, 1985.

In 1985, US 218 was bypassed around Iowa City and Coralville, joining I-380 at the I-80 interchange. US 218 to Cedar Rapids was replaced by Iowa 965. In the early 1990s, most of I-380 was designated as part of the Avenue of the Saints corridor, which connects Saint Louis, Missouri, to Saint Paul, Minnesota. Avenue of the Saints route markers were erected along the route the next year. In August 2001, the Avenue of the Saints in Iowa was given a single designation, Iowa 27, to facilitate following the route through the state.

Flooding
I-380 crosses two of Iowa's major rivers, the Iowa and Cedar rivers. Both rivers have affected the Interstate during major floods, as the case was in 1993 and 2008. During the Great Flood of 1993, I-380 and Iowa 965 were both closed at the Iowa River's Coralville Lake reservoir between July 13 and 28. The roads reopened after the lake's waters receded enough to allow Iowa DOT inspectors to check the three bridges over the water.

The Iowa flood of 2008 affected the same section of I-380 at the Iowa River in much the same fashion as in 1993. I-380 and former Iowa 965 were closed at the Iowa River on June 13 until July 3. In Cedar Rapids, flooding did not close I-380; the only bridge not to close, though traffic was restricted through the city. The flooding damage was much more severe in Cedar Rapids than in Iowa City.

Exit list

References

External links 

 Iowa Department of Transportation – I-380 time lapse flooding
 Iowa Highways – Interstate 380
 Interstate 380 Iowa @ Interstate-Guide.com

80-3
80-3 Iowa
3 Iowa
Transportation in Johnson County, Iowa
Transportation in Linn County, Iowa
Transportation in Benton County, Iowa
Transportation in Buchanan County, Iowa
Transportation in Black Hawk County, Iowa